Kamil Gampe was a Czechoslovakian modern pentathlete. He competed at the 1928 Summer Olympics.

References

External links
  

Year of birth missing
Possibly living people
Czechoslovak male modern pentathletes
Olympic modern pentathletes of Czechoslovakia
Modern pentathletes at the 1928 Summer Olympics